Mark Cotney (born June 26, 1952), is a former professional American football player who played in 10 NFL seasons from 1975 to 1984 for the Houston Oilers and Tampa Bay Buccaneers. Selected by the Buccaneers in the 1976 NFL Expansion Draft, he was a member of the original winless 1976 team and the 1979 team that played in the 1979 NFC Championship game. He retired in 1986 on advice from his doctors, after suffering two cracked vertebrae in his neck while tackling Gerald Riggs in a 1985 preseason game. He continues to live in the Tampa area.

References

1952 births
Living people
People from Altus, Oklahoma
American football safeties
Houston Oilers players
Tampa Bay Buccaneers players
Tampa Bay Buccaneers coaches
Cameron Aggies football players